Teaonui Tehau (born 1 September 1992) is a Tahitian footballer who plays as a striker or as a midfielder for A.S. Vénus. He is the cousin of the brothers Alvin Tehau, Lorenzo Tehau and Jonathan Tehau, all of them playing for Tahiti.

International career
He has represented Tahiti at both junior and senior level. He was also part of the history making 2012 OFC Nations Cup squad which won the tournament.

International goals
As of match played 18 July 2019. Tahiti score listed first, score column indicates score after each Tehau goal.

Honours
Individual
IFFHS OFC Men's Team of the Decade 2011–2020
Topscorer Champions League: 
 1 (2022)
Topscorer Ligue 1: 
 6 (2013-14, 2016-17, 2017-18, 2018-19, 2020-21, 2021-22)
Topscorer Tahiti Cup: 
2

References

1992 births
Living people
French Polynesian footballers
Tahitian beach soccer players
Tahiti international footballers
Association football forwards
2012 OFC Nations Cup players
2013 FIFA Confederations Cup players
2016 OFC Nations Cup players